Office of Legal Affairs may refer to:

 United Nations Office of Legal Affairs
 Office of Legal Affairs, Legal Services Corporation
 Office of Legal Affairs, National Mediation Board

See also 
 Office of the Legal Adviser, United States Department of State
 Office of Legal Counsel, United States Department of Justice